Philip Hamilton (January 22, 1782 – November 24, 1801) was the eldest child of Alexander Hamilton, the first U.S. Secretary of the Treasury, and Elizabeth Schuyler Hamilton. He died at age 19, fatally shot in a duel with George Eacker.

Birth and early childhood
Philip Hamilton was born in Albany, New York, on January 22, 1782. His father, Alexander Hamilton, was the first U.S. Secretary of the Treasury and one of the Founding Fathers of the United States. His mother, Elizabeth Schuyler Hamilton, was the daughter of Philip Schuyler, for whom he was named.

Alexander Hamilton wrote that Philip's birth was "attended with all the omens of future greatness," and continued to express high expectations and hopes for the future of his firstborn:

Education
Late in 1791, at the age of nine, Philip was sent to attend a boarding school in Trenton, New Jersey, studying with William Frazer, an Episcopal clergyman and rector of St. Michael's Church. In early December that year, his father wrote encouragingly from Philadelphia:  By 1794, his younger brother Alexander Jr., then eight years old, joined him at the boarding school.

Philip enrolled in Columbia College, where his knowledge and enthusiasm were compared to that of his father, already a renowned alumnus. Robert Troup, a family friend who had been Alexander Hamilton's college roommate, wrote that Philip "was very promising in genius and acquirements, and Hamilton formed high expectations of his future greatness!" Troup wrote privately, however, that despite Hamilton's certainty that Philip was destined for greatness, "alas Philip is a sad rake and I have serious doubts whether he would ever be an honour to his family or his country."

Philip graduated with honors from Columbia College in 1800, and went on to study law. His father prescribed rigorous study routines, including waking for study at 6 o'clock every day from April through September, and not later than 7 o'clock for the rest of the year, after which, "From the time he is dressed in the morning til nine o'clock (the time for breakfast excluded) he is to read law."

Duel and death 
On July 4, 1801, a New York lawyer named George Eacker gave an Independence Day speech hosted by a New York State Militia brigade and by the Tammany Society. The Tammany Society, better known as Tammany Hall, was a Democratic-Republican party political organization that Aaron Burr had built into a political machine. In the speech, Eacker reportedly said that Alexander Hamilton would not be opposed to overthrowing Thomas Jefferson's presidency by force.

Four months later, on November 20, 1801, Philip and a friend named Stephen Price encountered Eacker while attending a play at the Park Theatre. Philip confronted Eacker about the speech, and in the ensuing disturbance, Eacker was heard to call Philip and Price "damned rascals". In response to the verbal hostilities and Eacker's insult, the two formally challenged Eacker to a duel. Acquaintances wrote that Alexander Hamilton counseled his son, telling him to engage in a delope, throwing away his first shot.

The duel took place in Paulus Hook, New Jersey (today Jersey City), a few miles from where the elder Hamilton would later be mortally wounded in a duel with Burr. Eacker faced Philip and Price separately, dueling Price the day after the challenge, and Philip the following day. In Eacker's duel with Price, neither party was injured, but four shots were fired. The next day, November 23, 1801, Philip took his father's advice, and refused to raise his pistol to fire after he and Eacker had counted ten paces and faced each other. Eacker, following suit, did not shoot either. For the first minute, both men stood, doing nothing, both refusing to shoot. After a minute, Eacker finally raised his pistol, and Philip did the same. Eacker shot and struck Philip above his right hip. The bullet went through his body and lodged in his left arm. In what may have been an involuntary spasm, Philip also fired his pistol before he hit the ground, but this bullet did nothing.

As Philip fell on the ground bleeding, he displayed, as described by both sides, exemplary poise and dignity. "His manner on the ground was calm and composed beyond expression," the New York Post reported. "The idea of his own danger seemed to be lost in anticipation of the satisfaction which he might receive from the final triumph of his generous moderation." Philip was then rushed across the river to the home of his aunt, Angelica Schuyler Church, in Manhattan. She wrote, "His conduct was extraordinary during this trial."

Upon hearing of the events, Alexander Hamilton rushed to the home of Dr. David Hosack, the same physician who would later attend him after his own fatal duel in 1804. Hamilton wished to inform Hosack of the possible need for his medical services. Hosack's family told Hamilton that he, having already heard about the duel, had already left for the home of John and Angelica Church, Philip's aunt and uncle, where Philip had been taken. Hosack wrote that when Alexander had arrived at the Hosacks' home, he "was so much overcome by his anxiety that he fainted and remained some time in my family before he was sufficiently recovered to proceed" to the Church home to see his son. When Hamilton arrived, he observed the pale and ashen appearance of Philip's face and tested his pulse. According to Hosack, "he instantly turned from the bed and, taking me by the hand, which he grasped with all the agony of grief, he exclaimed in a tone and manner that can never be effaced from my memory, 'Doctor, I despair.'" Philip's mother was three months pregnant at this time, and upon her arrival, she and Hamilton stayed beside Philip through the night. After making a profession of faith, Philip died at 5:00am, fourteen hours after the initial wound.

Philip was buried on a stormy day, with many mourners in attendance. It was reported that as Hamilton approached his son's grave, he had to be held up by friends and family, due to grief. Philip's unmarked grave is near the graves of his parents and aunt, in the churchyard of Trinity Church in New York City.

Aftermath 
Following Philip's death, his family fell into disarray. His 17-year-old sister, Angelica Hamilton, suffered a mental breakdown from which she never recovered; her mental state deteriorated until she became only intermittently lucid, and she sometimes could not even recognize family members. She spent the rest of her life in a state described as "eternal childhood," often talking to her brother as if he were still alive.

Friends of the family wrote that Philip's parents never went back to their old selves after the death of their son. On June 2, 1802, Elizabeth gave birth to their youngest child, with whom she was pregnant at the time of Philip's death. They named the baby Philip Hamilton, in memory of his older brother.

In popular culture 
In the 2015 Broadway musical Hamilton, the role of Philip was originated by Anthony Ramos.

References 

1782 births
1801 deaths
Alexander Hamilton
People from Albany, New York
American people of Dutch descent
American people of Scottish descent
Columbia College (New York) alumni
Hamilton family
Schuyler family
Deaths by firearm in New Jersey
Duelling fatalities
Burials at Trinity Church Cemetery
American duellists